Elopement is a marriage conducted in sudden and secretive fashion.

Elopement may also refer to:

 Elopement (film), a 1951 comedy
 Wandering (dementia)